William Charles Berwick Sayers (1881–1960) was a British librarian and teacher. He was one of a "small but remarkable" group of librarians involved in public libraries in the early 20th century and was President of the Library Association in the United Kingdom in the year 1938.

Early life
Sayers was born in Mitcham, Surrey on 23 December 1881.

Career
In 1896 Sayers began as a junior assistant at the Bournemouth Public Library and in 1904 he was appointed as deputy librarian, working under principal librarian Stanley Jast, at the Public Library in Croydon which then a small country town near south London. 

In 1915, he became the chief librarian of the Croydon Public Library and under his leadership he introduced a library service for children and during the 1930s he opened several branch libraries. He made every library an arts centre with a "programme of lectures, recitals and exhibitions". He also set up libraries in hospitals and schools in the county. He was successful in convincing the local council to provide a generous budget and his libraries gained an international reputation for their high standards.

After the Second World War, during which he had been badly injured while serving as a Civil Defence controller, he retired from the Croydon Public Libraries.

Legacy
Sayers contributed in several areas of librarianship: he served in the Library Assistants' Association, contributed to children's librarianship, was a respected teacher and "an outstanding authority" on library classification, and served as a long-term editor of the journal Library World.

He was also a personal friend of musician Samuel Coleridge-Taylor, and after Coleridge-Taylor's untimely death in 1912, Coleridge-Taylor's widow asked Sayers to become his biographer.

Bibliography

As author 
 The Grammar of Classification, Croydon, Central Library, 1912.
 Samuel Coleridge-Taylor, Musician. His Life and Letters, Cassell & Co., 1916, 2nd ed. 1927.
 A Manual of Classification for Librarians & Bibliographers, London: Grafton & Co., 1926, 2nd ed. 1944.
 A Manual of Children's Libraries, Allen & Unwin, 1932.
 An Introduction to Library Classification, London, Grafton & Co., 1935.
 Library Local Collections, Allen & Unwin, 1938.

As editor
 James Duff Brown, Manual of Library Economy, 5th ed. Revised by W. C. Berwick Sayers. London, Grafton, 1931.
 Books for Youth: A Classified and Annotated Guide for Young Readers, London, Library Association, 1936.

Further reading
 D.J. Foskett and B.I. Palmer, eds., The Sayers Memorial Volume, London: Library Association, 1961; 
 Munford, W. A., A History of The Library Association, 1877-1977, London: The Library Association, 1976; 
Ranganathan, S.R., "Sayers and Donker Duyvis: Theory and Manner of Library Classification", Annals of Library Science, 8(3) September 1961, 85-99.

References

External links 
 Sayers, W. C. Berwick (William Charles Berwick) 1881-1960
 Collection AR1011 - W.C. Berwick Sayers Collection
 Painting of W. C. Berwick Sayers

British librarians
1881 births
1960 deaths